Sergei Alekseyevich Zhideyev (born 2 April 1987) is a former Russian professional football player.

Club career
He played in the Russian Football National League for FC MVD Rossii Moscow in 2009.

External links
 
 

1987 births
Sportspeople from Kursk
Living people
Russian footballers
Association football goalkeepers
FC Dynamo Stavropol players
PFC CSKA Moscow players
FC Avangard Kursk players
FC MVD Rossii Moscow players